{{DISPLAYTITLE:C4H4}}
The molecular formula C4H4 (molar mass: 52.07 g/mol) may refer to:

 Butatriene
 Cyclobutadiene
 Cyclobutyne
 Methylenecyclopropene
 Tetrahedrane
 Vinylacetylene

Molecular formulas